Chichicuepon, was lord of Chalco, Mexico.

Poetry
Only one poem survived.

Poems attributed to Chichicuepon include:

Chichicuepon Icuic (Now Give Heed To The Word)

References

Nahuatl-language poets
Place of birth unknown
Place of death unknown